Conochares was a genus of moths of the family Noctuidae, it is now considered a synonym of Ponometia.

Former species
 Conochares acutus Smith, 1905
 Conochares altera Smith, 1903
 Conochares arizonae H. Edwards, 1878
 Conochares catalina Smith, 1906
 Conochares elegantula Harvey, 1876
 Conochares rectangula McDunnough, 1943

References
 Conochares at Markku Savela's Lepidoptera and Some Other Life Forms
 Natural History Museum Lepidoptera genus database

Acontiinae
Obsolete arthropod taxa